Khunu Qullu (Aymara khunu snow, qullu mountain, "snow mountain",  Hispanicized spelling Cuno Ccollo) is a mountain in the Andes of southern Peru, about  high. It is located in the Moquegua Region, Mariscal Nieto Province, Carumas District, near Qina Mich'ini.

References

Mountains of Moquegua Region
Mountains of Peru